Volkswacht (German for 'People's Watch') is a name that have been used by a number of newspaper, generally with a leftist or social democratic orientation:
 Volkswacht of Bielefeld, 1890-1933
 Volkswacht of Silesia, Breslau, 1890-1933
 Volkswacht (Danzig)
 Volkswacht for the Upper Palatinate and Lower Bavaria, Regensburg, 1920-1933
 Volkswacht (Freiburg), 1911-1933
 Volkswacht am Bodensee, Romanshorn, Switzerland, 1909-1934
Volkswacht (Insterburg)